The Prison Officers (Pensions) Act 1902 (2 Edw 7 c. 9) was an Act of Parliament of the Parliament of the United Kingdom, given the royal assent on 22 July 1902 and repealed in 1927.

It amended the Prison Act 1877 to confirm and clarify the system for granting pension annuities to prison officers, stating that they were to not exceed the routine civil service scale, except in special circumstances, and then were not to exceed a maximum of two-thirds of the original salary.

The Act was repealed by the Statute Law Revision Act 1927.

References
The Public General Acts Passed in the Second Year of the Reign of His Majesty King Edward the Seventh. London: printed for His Majesty's Stationery Office. 1902.
Chronological table of the statutes; HMSO, London. 1993.

United Kingdom Acts of Parliament 1902
Repealed United Kingdom Acts of Parliament